John Eastwood may refer to:

John H. Eastwood (1911–2007), World War II US Army Chaplain
John S. Eastwood (1857–1924), American engineer who built the world's first reinforced concrete multiple arch dam
John Eastwood (politician) (1887–1952), British Conservative Member of Parliament